This is a list of the 50 busiest airports in North America. List is ranked by total passengers per year. Data is sourced from annual reports provided by Airports Council International. Tables also show the percentage change in total passengers for each airport as well as change in ranking in comparison to the previous year. Historic rankings dating back to 2013 are also presented.

Evolution in graph

2020

2019

2018

2017

2016

2015

2014

2013

See also 

 List of the busiest airports in the United States
 List of the busiest airports in Canada
 List of the busiest airports in Mexico
 List of the busiest airports in the Caribbean
 List of the busiest airports in Central America

References 

North America
Airports in North America
Aviation in North America
 Busiest